No Min-woo (born May 29, 1986) is a South Korean actor, musician, singer and songwriter. He is also known under the stage names ICON and MINUE. He debuted as a drummer in TRAX in 2004, and left the band two years later. In 2008, he began acting in various television series and movies, such as Pasta, My Girlfriend is a Nine-Tailed Fox and Full House Take 2, and he regularly contributes to movie and drama soundtracks. In 2013, No made a comeback as a singer under the stage name ICON. In 2016 he enlisted in the military, and returned in 2018. In 2020, he made a comeback as the lead singer and leader of the newly formed band The Midnight Romance.

Career

No Min-woo was born in Japan while his mother, then 20 years old, was aspiring to become an enka singer there. 

He moved back and forth between Korea and Japan for a long time, and started playing the piano at age 7. 

He has a younger brother, No Jeong-hun, who is a singer under the pseudonym I'll (아일).

He made his debut as the drummer (with the stage name Rose) in the rock band TraxX in 2004. Prior to debut, No appeared in "2002 Survival Audition HeeJun vs. KangTa Battle of the Century" with bandmates Typhoon and Attack, as well as Kim Junsu, Super Junior's Sungmin and Eunhyuk.  

No left TraxX in 2006, and briefly became a guitarist for The Romantist before it disbanded. 

In 2009 he returned to the music scene as the leader of the project group 24/7, with Lee Jang-woo and Hyun Woo. They released the single 24 Hours a Day, 7 Days a Week.

No began pursuing an acting career in 2008 and gained notice with his supporting roles in the 2010 South Korean television series Pasta and My Girlfriend is a Nine-Tailed Fox. He landed his first leading role in the four-episode drama special Rock Rock Rock, a biographical film about the life of Boohwal lead guitarist Kim Tae-won. 

In 2011 for his role as a cancer patient in the SBS television series Midas, No lost 9.5 kilograms (21 pounds). 

His long-delayed television series Full House Take 2 (a loose sequel to the 2004 hit) secured air dates on Japan's TBS and Korean cable channel SBS Plus in 2012. No was cast as the male lead in the Chinese television series Love Expiration Date, for which he will also serve as OST music director, composing and writing songs for the soundtrack.

In 2012 his contract with Core Contents Media came to an end, and he established his own management company, MJ Dreamsys.

In 2013, on July 1, No released his MV, ROCKSTAR, under his newly opened YouTube channel, officialminewTV.

In 2014, No appeared in a minor role in Roaring Currents (released July 30, 2014), which became the highest-grossing film of all time in South Korea. Later in 2014, No played one of the main characters in The Greatest Marriage.

No starred in MBC Dramanet's My Unfortunate Boyfriend, which premiered on April 10, 2015.

In 2019, No played a lead role in the MBC television series Partners for Justice 2 as Jang Chul, a talented but mysterious ER doctor. 

On May 17, 2020, his newly formed band The Midnight Romance (stylized in all caps) released their self-titled debut single of the same name which consisted of three songs. 

On January 19, 2022 it was confirmed that No signed an exclusive contract with n.CH Entertainment.

Lawsuit
In April 2015, No filed a lawsuit against his former agency, S.M. Entertainment, as well as reported the agency to the South Korea Fair Trade Commission. Documents from the lawsuit reveal that No originally signed a 17-year exclusive contract with S.M. No sought 100 million KRW for damages resulting from the agency's interference in his career. 

On July 21, 2016 No lost his damage suit against S.M as a result of insufficient evidence and the court ruled out the contract between S.M and No invalid.

In June 2018, it was reported No had lost the appeal in his lawsuit against S.M. Entertainment due to the insufficient evidence to the above stated claims.

Military enlistment
No was confirmed to have quietly enlisted for his mandatory military service in October 2016. He was discharged in July 2018.

Filmography

Television drama

Film

Television shows

Theater

Discography

 The Midnight Romance - 1st Debut Single of THE MIDNIGHT ROMANCE (2020) 
 Dream Baby Dream
 Midnight Romance
 해줄래 (IMYT) 
 Partners for Justice 2 OST (2019)
 Dr. K
 Poison (as composer of the track)
 Jupiter - Digital Single (Under the name MINUE) (2018) 
 Intro/Motion Stop
 Jupiter
 Trust Me 
 Gravity - Japanese Debut Single (Under the name MINUE) (2016)
 Gravity
 We rock
 Believe
 My Unfortunate Boyfriend OST (2015)
 I Love You
 Shining Love
 ICON  the 1st Single Album (2013)
 ROCKSTAR
 Baby
 Hello
 Alive
 The Greatest Marriage OST (2014)
 Crazy Love
 God's Gift - 14 Days OST (2014)
 Snake Eyes
 Heaven
 Love Expiration Date OST (2013)
 1 Minute 1 Second
 Full House Take 2 OST (2012)
 Touch (singer)
 Sad Touch (singer)
 Hello Hello (singer)
 Midas OST (2011)
 슬픈사랑 Seulpheun Sarang (lyricist, singer)
 사랑해도 되나요 Sarangaedo doinayo (composer, singer)
  My Girlfriend is a Nine-Tailed Fox OST (2010)
 Trap
 Story of Wine OST (lyricist, music director, singer; 2009)
 자작나무 (Love is you)　　
 Even now (Singer:Sunny)　　
 Firstsnow　　
 Nobody　　
 Confession
 MyPerfect Romance　　
 Peaceof Melody　　
 Express
 That guy's woman (2009)
 Rhapsody Album (2005)
 Blaze Away Album (2005)
 Paradox  Album (2004)
 Scorpio Album (2004)

Awards and nominations

References

External links 

 Official Website
 

1986 births
K-pop singers
Inha University alumni
Living people
MBK Entertainment artists
South Korean male idols
South Korean male television actors
South Korean television personalities
South Korean male film actors
21st-century South Korean male  singers